Barnowo  is a village in the administrative district of Gmina Kołczygłowy, within Bytów County, Pomeranian Voivodeship, in northern Poland.

Before 1637 Duchy of Pomerania, next area of Farther Pomerania, was part of Germany. For the history of the region, see History of Pomerania.

The village has a population of 370.

References

Barnowo